Penicillium hennebertii is a species of the genus of Penicillium.

References

hennebertii
Fungi described in 2011